Nebularia contracta is a species of sea snail, a marine gastropod mollusc in the family Mitridae, the miters or miter snails.

Distribution
This marine species occurs off Papua New Guinea.

References

External links
 Swainson, W. (1820-1823). Zoological Illustrations, or, original figures and descriptions of new, rare, or interesting animals, selected chiefly from the classes of ornithology, entomology, and conchology, and arranged on the principles of Cuvier and other modern zoologists. London: Baldwin, Cradock & Joe; Strand: W. Wood. (Vol. 1-3): pl. 1-18
 Fedosov A., Puillandre N., Herrmann M., Kantor Yu., Oliverio M., Dgebuadze P., Modica M.V. & Bouchet P. (2018). The collapse of Mitra: molecular systematics and morphology of the Mitridae (Gastropoda: Neogastropoda). Zoological Journal of the Linnean Society. 183(2): 253-337
 

contracta
Gastropods described in 1820